Manettia nebulosa is a species of plant in the family Rubiaceae. It is endemic to Ecuador.

References

nebu
Endemic flora of Ecuador
Critically endangered flora of South America
Taxonomy articles created by Polbot